Francesco Antonio Balduini (died 1539) was a Roman Catholic prelate who served as Bishop of Alessano (1531–1539).

Biography
On 15 November 1531, Francesco Antonio Balduini was appointed during the papacy of Pope Clement VII as Bishop of Alessano. He served as Bishop of Alessano until his death in 1539.

References

External links and additional sources
 (for Chronology of Bishops) 
 (for Chronology of Bishops) 

16th-century Italian Roman Catholic bishops
Bishops appointed by Pope Clement VII
1539 deaths